Count Gavrila (Gavriil) Ivanovich Golovkin (1660 – 20 January 1734) was a Russian statesman who formally presided over foreign affairs of the Russian Empire from 1706 until his death. The real control over Russian diplomacy during his lengthy term in office was exercised by Boris Kurakin until 1727 and by Andrey Osterman after his death.

In 1677, while still a young man, Gavrila Golovkin was attached to the court of the tsarevich Peter, with whose mother Nataliya he was connected, and vigilantly guarded him during the disquieting period of the regency of Sophia. He accompanied the young tsar abroad on his first foreign tour, and worked by his side in the dockyards of Zaandam. In 1706, he succeeded Golovin in the direction of foreign policy, and was created the first Russian grand-chancellor on the field of Poltava (1709). Golovkin held this office for twenty-five years.

In the reign of Catherine I, he became a member of the Supreme Privy Council, which had the chief conduct of affairs during this and the succeeding reigns. The empress also entrusted him with her last will whereby she appointed the young Peter II her successor and Golovkin one of his guardians. On the death of Peter II in 1730, he declared openly in favour of Anna, duchess of Courland, in opposition to the aristocratic Dolgorukovs and Galitzines, and his determined attitude on behalf of autocracy was the chief cause of the failure of the proposed constitution, which would have converted Russia into a limited monarchy. Under Anna, he was a member of the first cabinet formed in Russia, but had less influence in affairs than Osterman and Munnich.

In 1707, Golovkin was created a count of the Holy Roman Empire, and in 1710 a count of the Russian Empire. He was one of the wealthiest, and at the same time one of the stingiest, magnates of his day. His ignorance of any language but his own made his intercourse with foreign ministers very inconvenient. For the ultimate disgrace of his relatives, see the Lopukhina Affair. Yury Golovkin, Russia's first ambassador to China, was his great-grandson.

References

External links
 List of Descendants at European Dynastics.com

Sources
 

Foreign ministers of the Russian Empire
Chancellors of the Russian Empire
Counts of the Russian Empire
1660 births
1734 deaths
17th-century Russian people
18th-century politicians from the Russian Empire
Counts of the Holy Roman Empire
Peter the Great
Members of the Supreme Privy Council
Cabinet ministers of the Russian Empire